Kyzlar-Birgan (Qıźźar-Birgän) is a rural locality (a village) and the administrative centre of Urkassky Selsoviet, Zilairsky District, Bashkortostan, Russia. The population was 350 as of 2010. There are 6 streets.

Geography 
Kyzlar-Birgan is located 100 km north of Zilair (the district's administrative centre) by road. Kananikolskoye is the nearest rural locality.

References 

Rural localities in Zilairsky District